Air Navigation and Engineering Company Limited was a British aircraft manufacturer from its formation in 1919 to 1927.

History

The company was formed in 1919 when the Blériot & SPAD Manufacturing Company Limited was renamed.  The company was based at Addlestone Surrey.

The Blériot aircraft company had opened a factory at Addlestone during World War I to make SPAD and Avro aircraft and in 1919 the company became the Air Navigation and Engineering Company Limited. One of the first products was a cyclecar designed by Herbert Jones and W.D. Marchant called the Blériot-Whippet.

In 1922 the company built a 10-seat biplane airliner (the Handasyde H.2) on behalf of the Handasyde Aircraft Company Limited. The company built a number of light aircraft, the first designed by W.S. Shackelton was the ANEC I flying in 1923. The aircraft were built at Addlestone then roaded to Brooklands for flight testing. The company stopped producing aircraft in 1926 and closed in 1927.

Aircraft designs

ANEC I – (1923) One-engine one-seat ultralight monoplane.  Three built
ANEC II – (1924) One-engine two-seat variant of ANEC I.  One built
ANEC III – (1926) One-engine biplane six-passenger airliner or mailplane.  Three built
ANEC IV – (1926) One-engine two-seat biplane sport aircraft.  One built

Car designs
 Blériot-Whippet
 Eric Longden (cyclecar brand)

References

 Jackson, A.J. British Civil Aircraft Since 1919 Volume 1. London: Putnam, 1974. . 
 Smith, Ron. British Built Aircraft Greater London. London: Tempus Publishing, 2002. .

Defunct aircraft manufacturers of the United Kingdom
Defunct motor vehicle manufacturers of the United Kingdom
Manufacturing companies established in 1919
Technology companies established in 1919
Vehicle manufacturing companies established in 1919